Microgaza is a genus of sea snails, marine gastropod mollusks in the family Solariellidae.

Description
The flattened shell is rotelliform, resembling a species from the genus Gaza without the reflected lip or umbilical callus. The shell is brilliantly nacreous when fresh. It has a distinctly scalariform umbilicus.

Species
Species within the genus Microgaza include:
 † Microgaza bailyi (Gabb, 1861)
 Microgaza rotella Dall, 1881
 Microgaza vetula Woodring, 1928
Species brought into synonymy
 Microgaza alabida (Marshall, 1979) accepted as Archiminolia alabida (B. A. Marshall, 1979)
 Microgaza corona Lee Y.C. & Wu W.L., 2001: synonym of Elaphriella corona (Y.-C. Lee & W.-L. Wu, 2001) (original combination)
 Microgaza dawsoni (Marshall, 1979) accepted as Archiminolia dawsoni (B. A. Marshall, 1979)
 Microgaza fulgens Dall, 1907: synonym of Ilanga fulgens (Dall, 1907)
 Microgaza gotoi Poppe, Tagaro & Dekker, 2006: synonym of Ilanga gotoi (Poppe, Tagaro & Dekker, 2006)
 Microgaza hurleyi (Marshall, 1979) accepted as Archiminolia hurleyi (B. A. Marshall, 1979)
 Microgaza inornata Quinn, 1979: synonym of Microgaza rotella inornata Quinn, 1979 
 Microgaza iridescens (Habe, 1968): synonym of Archiminolia iridescens (Habe, 1961)
 Microgaza katoi (Kuroda & Habe, 1961): synonym of Archiminolia katoi (Kuroda & Habe, 1961)
 Microgaza konos Vilvens, 2009: synonym of Ilanga konos (Vilvens, 2009) (original combination)
 Microgaza navakaensis Ladd, 1982: synonym of Ilanga navakaensis (Ladd, 1982) (original combination)
 Microgaza norfolkensis Marshall, 1999; synonym of Ilanga norfolkensis (B. A. Marshall, 1999)
 Microgaza opalina (Shikama & Hayashi, 1977): synonym of Elaphriella opalina (Shikama & Hayashi, 1977) (original combination)
 Microgaza ziczac Kuroda & Habe, 1971: synonym of Archiminolia ziczac (Kuroda & Habe, 1971)

References

 Williams S.T., Karube S. & Ozawa T. (2008) Molecular systematics of Vetigastropoda: Trochidae, Turbinidae and Trochoidea redefined. Zoologica Scripta 37: 483–506

External links
 W.H. Dall (1881), Preliminary Report of dredgings by USS Blake; Bulletin of the Museum of Comparative Zoology at Harvard College v. 9 pp. 1–144

 
Solariellidae